

Rolf Wuthmann (26 August 1893 – 20 October 1977) was a German general in the Wehrmacht during World War II who commanded the IX Army Corps. He was a recipient of the Knight's Cross of the Iron Cross.

Wuthmann surrendered to the Red Army in the course of the 1945 Soviet Zemland Offensive. Convicted as a war criminal in the Soviet Union, he was held until 1955.

Awards and decorations

 Knight's Cross of the Iron Cross on 22 August 1944 as General der Artillerie and commander of IX. Armeekorps

References

Citations

Bibliography

 

1893 births
1977 deaths
German Army generals of World War II
Generals of Artillery (Wehrmacht)
Recipients of the Knight's Cross of the Iron Cross
German prisoners of war in World War II held by the Soviet Union
Military personnel from Kassel